Ununennium, also known as eka-francium or element 119, is the hypothetical chemical element with symbol Uue and atomic number 119. Ununennium and Uue are the temporary systematic IUPAC name and symbol respectively, which are used until the element is discovered, confirmed, and a permanent name is decided upon. In the periodic table of the elements, it is expected to be an s-block element, an alkali metal, and the first element in the eighth period. It is the lightest element that has not yet been synthesized.

An attempt to synthesize the element has been ongoing since 2018 in RIKEN in Japan. The Joint Institute for Nuclear Research in Dubna, Russia, plans to make an attempt at some point in the future, but a precise date has not been released to the public. Theoretical and experimental evidence has shown that the synthesis of ununennium will likely be far more difficult than that of the previous elements.

Ununennium's position as the seventh alkali metal suggests that it would have similar properties to its lighter congeners. However, relativistic effects may cause some of its properties to differ from those expected from a straight application of periodic trends. For example, ununennium is expected to be less reactive than caesium and francium and closer in behavior to potassium or rubidium, and while it should show the characteristic +1 oxidation state of the alkali metals, it is also predicted to show the +3 and +5 oxidation states, which are unknown in any other alkali metal.

Introduction

History

Synthesis attempts

Elements 114 to 118 (flerovium through oganesson) were discovered in "hot fusion" reactions at the Joint Institute for Nuclear Research (JINR) in Dubna, Russia. This involved bombarding the actinides plutonium through californium with calcium-48, a quasi-stable neutron-rich isotope which could be used as a projectile to produce more neutron-rich isotopes of superheavy elements. (The term "hot" refers to the high excitation energy of the resulting compound nucleus.) This cannot easily be continued to element 119, because it would require a target of the next actinide einsteinium. Tens of milligrams of einsteinium would be needed for a reasonable chance of success, but only micrograms have so far been produced. An attempt to make element 119 from calcium-48 and less than a microgram of einsteinium was made in 1985 at the superHILAC accelerator at Berkeley, California, but did not succeed.

More practical production of further superheavy elements requires projectiles heavier than 48Ca, but this makes the reaction more symmetric and gives it a smaller chance of success. Attempts to synthesize element 119 push the limits of current technology, due to the decreasing cross sections of the production reactions and the probably short half-lives of produced isotopes, expected to be on the order of microseconds.

From April to September 2012, an attempt to synthesize the isotopes 295Uue and 296Uue was made by bombarding a target of berkelium-249 with titanium-50 at the GSI Helmholtz Centre for Heavy Ion Research in Darmstadt, Germany. This reaction between 249Bk and 50Ti was predicted to be the most favorable practical reaction for formation of ununennium, as it is the most asymmetric reaction available. Moreover, as berkelium-249 decays to californium-249 (the next element) with a short half-life of 327 days, this allowed elements 119 and 120 to be searched for simultaneously. Due to the predicted short half-lives, the GSI team used new "fast" electronics capable of registering decay events within microseconds.
 +  → * → no atoms
 +  → * → no atoms
Neither element 119 nor element 120 was observed. The experiment was originally planned to continue to November 2012, but was stopped early to make use of the 249Bk target to confirm the synthesis of tennessine (thus changing the projectiles to 48Ca).

The team at RIKEN in Wakō, Japan began bombarding curium-248 targets with a vanadium-51 beam in January 2018 to search for element 119. Curium was chosen as a target, rather than heavier berkelium or californium, as these heavier targets are difficult to prepare. The 248Cm targets were provided by Oak Ridge National Laboratory. RIKEN developed a high-intensity vanadium beam. The experiment began at a cyclotron while RIKEN upgraded its linear accelerators; the upgrade was completed in 2020. Bombardment may be continued with both machines until the first event is observed; the experiment is currently running intermittently for at least 100 days per year. The RIKEN team's efforts are being financed by the Emperor of Japan.

 +  → * → no atoms yet

The produced isotopes of ununennium are expected to undergo two alpha decays to known isotopes of moscovium, 287Mc and 288Mc. This would anchor them to a known sequence of five or six further alpha decays, respectively, and corroborate their production.

The team at the JINR plans to attempt synthesis of element 119 in the future, but a precise timeframe has not been publicly released. Beams heavier than 48Ca have not been used at the JINR to produce such heavy elements, but they are actively being developed.

Naming
Using Mendeleev's nomenclature for unnamed and undiscovered elements, ununennium should be known as eka-francium. Using the 1979 IUPAC recommendations, the element should be temporarily called ununennium (symbol Uue) until it is discovered, the discovery is confirmed, and a permanent name chosen. Although widely used in the chemical community on all levels, from chemistry classrooms to advanced textbooks, the recommendations are mostly ignored among scientists who work theoretically or experimentally on superheavy elements, who call it "element 119", with the symbol E119, (119) or 119.

Predicted properties

Nuclear stability and isotopes

The stability of nuclei decreases greatly with the increase in atomic number after curium, element 96, whose half-life is four orders of magnitude longer than that of any currently known higher-numbered element. All isotopes with an atomic number above 101 undergo radioactive decay with half-lives of less than 30 hours. No elements with atomic numbers above 82 (after lead) have stable isotopes. Nevertheless, for reasons not yet well understood, there is a slight increase of nuclear stability around atomic numbers 110–114, which leads to the appearance of what is known in nuclear physics as the "island of stability". This concept, proposed by University of California professor Glenn Seaborg, explains why superheavy elements last longer than predicted.

The alpha-decay half-lives predicted for 291–307Uue are on the order of microseconds. The longest alpha-decay half-life predicted is ~485 microseconds for the isotope 294Uue. When factoring in all decay modes, the predicted half-lives drop further to only tens of microseconds. Some heavier isotopes may be more stable; Fricke and Waber predicted 315Uue to be the most stable ununennium isotope in 1971. This has consequences for the synthesis of ununennium, as isotopes with half-lives below one microsecond would decay before reaching the detector, and the heavier isotopes cannot be synthesised by the collision of any known usable target and projectile nuclei. Nevertheless, new theoretical models show that the expected gap in energy between the proton orbitals 2f7/2 (filled at element 114) and 2f5/2 (filled at element 120) is smaller than expected, so that element 114 no longer appears to be a stable spherical closed nuclear shell, and this energy gap may increase the stability of elements 119 and 120. The next doubly magic nucleus is now expected to be around the spherical 306Ubb (element 122), but the expected low half-life and low production cross section of this nuclide makes its synthesis challenging.

Atomic and physical
Being the first period 8 element, ununennium is predicted to be an alkali metal, taking its place in the periodic table below lithium, sodium, potassium, rubidium, caesium, and francium. Each of these elements has one valence electron in the outermost s-orbital (valence electron configuration ns1), which is easily lost in chemical reactions to form the +1 oxidation state: thus, the alkali metals are very reactive elements. Ununennium is predicted to continue the trend and have a valence electron configuration of 8s1. It is therefore expected to behave much like its lighter congeners; however, it is also predicted to differ from the lighter alkali metals in some properties.

The main reason for the predicted differences between ununennium and the other alkali metals is the spin–orbit (SO) interaction—the mutual interaction between the electrons' motion and spin. The SO interaction is especially strong for the superheavy elements because their electrons move faster—at speeds comparable to the speed of light—than those in lighter atoms. In ununennium atoms, it lowers the 7p and 8s electron energy levels, stabilizing the corresponding electrons, but two of the 7p electron energy levels are more stabilized than the other four. The effect is called subshell splitting, as it splits the 7p subshell into more-stabilized and the less-stabilized parts. Thus, the outer 8s electron of ununennium is stabilized and becomes harder to remove than expected, while the 7p3/2 electrons are correspondingly destabilized, perhaps allowing them to participate in chemical reactions. This stabilization of the outermost s-orbital (already significant in francium) is the key factor affecting ununennium's chemistry, and causes all the trends for atomic and molecular properties of alkali metals to reverse direction after caesium.

Due to the stabilization of its outer 8s electron, ununennium's first ionization energy—the energy required to remove an electron from a neutral atom—is predicted to be 4.53 eV, higher than those of the known alkali metals from potassium onward. This effect is so large that unbiunium (element 121) is predicted to have a lower ionization energy of 4.45 eV, so that the alkali metal in period 8 would not have the lowest ionization energy in the period, as is true for all previous periods. Ununennium's electron affinity is expected to be far greater than that of caesium and francium; indeed, ununennium is expected to have an electron affinity higher than all the alkali metals lighter than it at about 0.662 eV, close to that of cobalt (0.662 eV) and chromium (0.676 eV). Relativistic effects also cause a very large drop in the polarizability of ununennium to 169.7 a.u. Indeed, the static dipole polarisability (αD) of ununennium, a quantity for which the impacts of relativity are proportional to the square of the element's atomic number, has been calculated to be small and similar to that of sodium.

The electron of the hydrogen-like ununennium atom—oxidized so it has only one electron, Uue118+—is predicted to move so quickly that its mass is 1.99 times that of a non-moving electron, a consequence of relativistic effects. For comparison, the figure for hydrogen-like francium is 1.29 and the figure for hydrogen-like caesium is 1.091. According to simple extrapolations of relativity laws, that indirectly indicates the contraction of the atomic radius to around 240 pm, very close to that of rubidium (247 pm); the metallic radius is also correspondingly lowered to 260 pm. The ionic radius of Uue+ is expected to be 180 pm.

Ununennium is predicted to have a melting point between 0 °C and 30 °C: thus it may be a liquid at room temperature. It is not known whether this continues the trend of decreasing melting points down the group, as caesium's melting point is 28.5 °C and francium's is estimated to be around 8.0 °C. The boiling point of ununennium is expected to be around 630 °C, similar to that of francium, estimated to be around 620 °C; this is lower than caesium's boiling point of 671 °C. The density of ununennium has been variously predicted to be between 3 and 4 g/cm3, continuing the trend of increasing density down the group: the density of francium is estimated at 2.48 g/cm3, and that of caesium is known to be 1.93 g/cm3.

Chemical

The chemistry of ununennium is predicted to be similar to that of the alkali metals, but it would probably behave more like potassium or rubidium than caesium or francium. This is due to relativistic effects, as in their absence periodic trends would predict ununennium to be even more reactive than caesium and francium. This lowered reactivity is due to the relativistic stabilization of ununennium's valence electron, increasing ununennium's first ionization energy and decreasing the metallic and ionic radii; this effect is already seen for francium.

The chemistry of ununennium in the +1-oxidation state should be more similar to the chemistry of rubidium than to that of francium. On the other hand, the ionic radius of the Uue+ ion is predicted to be larger than that of Rb+, because the 7p orbitals are destabilized and are thus larger than the p-orbitals of the lower shells. Ununennium may also show the +3 oxidation state, which is not seen in any other alkali metal, in addition to the +1 oxidation state that is characteristic of the other alkali metals and is also the main oxidation state of all the known alkali metals: this is because of the destabilization and expansion of the 7p3/2 spinor, causing its outermost electrons to have a lower ionization energy than what would otherwise be expected. The 7p3/2 spinor's chemical activity has been suggested to make the +5 oxidation state possible in [UueF6]−, analogous to [SbF6]− or [BrF6]−. The analogous francium(V) compound, [FrF6]−, might also be achievable, but is not experimentally known.

Many ununennium compounds are expected to have a large covalent character, due to the involvement of the 7p3/2 electrons in the bonding: this effect is also seen to a lesser extent in francium, which shows some 6p3/2 contribution to the bonding in francium superoxide (FrO2). Thus, instead of ununennium being the most electropositive element, as a simple extrapolation would seem to indicate, caesium instead retains this position, with ununennium's electronegativity most likely being close to sodium's (0.93 on the Pauling scale). The standard reduction potential of the Uue+/Uue couple is predicted to be −2.9 V, the same as that of the Fr+/Fr couple and just over that of the K+/K couple at −2.931 V.

{| class="wikitable floatright" style="font-size:85%;""
|+ Bond lengths and bond-dissociation energies of MAu (M = an alkali metal). All data are predicted, except for the bond-dissociation energies of KAu, RbAu, and CsAu.
! Compound
! Bond length(Å)
! Bond-dissociationenergy (kJ/mol)
|-
! KAu
| 2.856
| 2.75
|-
! RbAu
| 2.967
| 2.48
|-
! CsAu
| 3.050
| 2.53
|-
! FrAu
| 3.097
| 2.75
|-
! UueAu
| 3.074
| 2.44
|}

In the gas phase, and at very low temperatures in the condensed phase, the alkali metals form covalently bonded diatomic molecules. The metal–metal bond lengths in these M2 molecules increase down the group from Li2 to Cs2, but then decrease after that to Uue2, due to the aforementioned relativistic effects that stabilize the 8s orbital. The opposite trend is shown for the metal–metal bond-dissociation energies. The Uue–Uue bond should be slightly stronger than the K–K bond. From these M2 dissociation energies, the enthalpy of sublimation (ΔHsub) of ununennium is predicted to be 94 kJ/mol (the value for francium should be around 77 kJ/mol).

The UueF molecule is expected to have a significant covalent character owing to the high electron affinity of ununennium. The bonding in UueF is predominantly between a 7p orbital on ununennium and a 2p orbital on fluorine, with lesser contributions from the 2s orbital of fluorine and the 8s, 6dz2, and the two other 7p orbitals of ununennium. This is very different from the behaviour of s-block elements, as well as gold and mercury, in which the s-orbitals (sometimes mixed with d-orbitals) are the ones participating in the bonding. The Uue–F bond is relativistically expanded due to the splitting of the 7p orbital into 7p1/2 and 7p3/2 spinors, forcing the bonding electrons into the largest orbital measured by radial extent: a similar expansion in bond length is found in the hydrides AtH and TsH. The Uue–Au bond should be the weakest of all bonds between gold and an alkali metal, but should still be stable. This gives extrapolated medium-sized adsorption enthalpies (−ΔHads) of 106 kJ/mol on gold (the francium value should be 136 kJ/mol), 76 kJ/mol on platinum, and 63 kJ/mol on silver, the smallest of all the alkali metals, that demonstrate that it would be feasible to study the chromatographic adsorption of ununennium onto surfaces made of noble metals. The enthalpy of adsorption of ununennium on a Teflon surface is predicted to be 17.6 kJ/mol, which would be the lowest among the alkali metals. The ΔHsub and −ΔHads values for the alkali metals change in opposite directions as atomic number increases.

See also
 Extended periodic table

Notes

References

Bibliography

External links
 

 
Alkali metals
119